Austrophlebia is a small genus of dragonflies in the family Telephlebiidae.
Species of this dragonfly are very large with strong yellow markings on the thorax. 
They are endemic to eastern Australia.

Species
The genus contains only two species:

 Austrophlebia costalis  – southern giant darner
 Austrophlebia subcostalis  – northern giant darner

References

Telephlebiidae
Anisoptera genera
Odonata of Australia
Endemic fauna of Australia
Taxa named by Robert John Tillyard